The Leicester South by-election was held to elect a Member of Parliament (MP) of the United Kingdom for the Leicester South constituency on 5 May 2011. It was prompted by the resignation of Sir Peter Soulsby of the Labour Party, who stood down from Parliament to contest the election for Mayor of Leicester. Soulsby was appointed Crown Steward and Bailiff of the Manor of Northstead on 1 April 2011, and the writ for a new election was issued on 5 April. The election was won by Labour Party candidate Jon Ashworth.

All registered Parliamentary electors (i.e. British, Irish and Commonwealth citizens living in the UK and British citizens living overseas) who were aged 18 or over on 5 May 2011 were entitled to vote in the by-election. The deadline for voters to register to vote in the by-election was midnight on Thursday 14 April 2011. However, those who qualified as an anonymous elector had until midnight on Tuesday 26 April 2011 to register to vote.

Background
Leicester South was very narrowly won by the Conservatives in 1983, and regained by Labour in the 1987 general election. After the death of Labour MP Jim Marshall, a by-election was held in July 2004 at which the Liberal Democrats gained the seat. Peter Soulsby regained the seat for Labour at the general election in May 2005; he increased his majority at the 2010 general election.

As a former Leader of Leicester City Council, Soulsby put his name forward for selection as the Labour Party candidate for the directly elected Mayoralty of Leicester after the city council voted to adopt a new leadership structure. In standing for selection he indicated that he would vacate his Parliamentary seat if selected. When Soulsby won the selection he immediately announced that he would indeed resign his seat. On 1 April 2011 the Chancellor of the Exchequer appointed Soulsby as Crown Steward and Bailiff of the Manor of Northstead, formally vacating the seat. Labour chief whip Rosie Winterton moved the motion on 5 April to issue a writ for a new election.

Candidates
Leicester City Council confirmed the list of candidates on 14 April 2011. With only five candidates, the poll had the shortest by-election ballot paper since the 2005 Cheadle by-election.

There was wide interest in the Labour candidate selection. One local councillor, Rory Palmer, entered the contest but—having accepted the offer of becoming Soulsby's deputy—subsequently withdrew. The official shortlist of five candidates was confirmed on 18 March and included three Leicester city councillors, Patrick Kitterick (who was also Chair of Leicester South Constituency Labour Party), Mian Mayat and Neil Clayton, along with Jonathan Ashworth, a former advisor to Gordon Brown and the then Head of Party Relations, and Josephine Channer, a councillor in the London Borough of Barking and Dagenham. On 19 March local Labour Party members selected Jon Ashworth, who won 106 votes out of 153 cast on the first ballot.

Former Liberal Democrat MP for the constituency Parmjit Singh Gill was initially selected as that party's candidate on 18 March. On 23 March he withdrew from the candidacy, saying that he wanted to concentrate on his position as a Leicester City Councillor; he was immediately replaced as candidate by Zuffar Haq.

On 15 March 2011, UKIP selected Abhijit Pandya, a former Leicester South resident and alumnus of the University of Leicester, as its candidate.

On 26 March the Conservatives selected Jane Hunt as their candidate. She had contested the Leicester East constituency at the General Election.

Result
Labour retained the seat with an increased majority.

See also
2004 Leicester South by-election
List of United Kingdom by-elections
Opinion polling for the 2015 United Kingdom general election

References

2011 elections in the United Kingdom
2011 in England
By-elections to the Parliament of the United Kingdom in Leicestershire constituencies
Elections in Leicester
2010s in Leicester